Hưng Thịnh may refer to:

Places

Vietnam
Hưng Thịnh, Hưng Nguyên, Nghệ An Province
Hưng Thịnh, Trảng Bom, Đồng Nai Province
Hưng Thịnh, Trấn Yên, Yên Bái Province
Hưng Thịnh, Bảo Lạc, Cao Bằng Province

Other uses